Oedoparena minor is a small (wing length 4.0-6.4) coastal fly from the family Dryomyzidae.

Distribution
Hokkaido, Japan.

Ecology
The ecology of this species is little known, Adults have been reared from Pupa found in the empty shells of dead barnacles. This is not unlike the life style of a North American species Oedoparena glauca, where the larvae feed on living barnacle, before pupating in a now empty barnical shell and then the adult flies emerge during the morning low tide.

References

Dryomyzidae
Diptera of Asia
Insects described in 1981